C&P Haulage Co Ltd v Middleton [1983] EWCA Civ 5 is an English contract law case, concerning damages for costs incurred by a claimant related to a defendant's breach of contract.

Facts
George Middleton had a licence to occupy premises for six months at a time, renewable. He used it for his car repair business. He improved the property, even though the contract stated fixtures were not to be removed at the end of the licence. C&P Haulage Co Ltd ejected him for breach of contract. Mr Middleton argued he should be entitled to damages for the cost of the improvements he had made.

Judgment
Ackner LJ held that Middleton’s loss did not flow from the breach of contract, but him going and doing the repairs when he was not meant to. So no recovery of reliance loss was available, where it would allow Middleton to escape a bad bargain or reverse the contractual allocation of risk.

See also

English contract law
Johnson v Agnew [1980] AC 367
Habton Farms v Nimmo [2003] EWCA Civ 68, [2004] QB 1, [2003] 3 WLR 633
The Golden Victory or Golden Strait Corporation v Nippon Yusen Kubishka Kaisha [2007] UKHL 12

Notes

References

English remedy case law
Court of Appeal (England and Wales) cases
1983 in case law
1983 in British law